Rose Marie Richmond (born 29 January 1981 in St. Petersburg, Florida) is a long jumper from the United States. Her personal best jump is 6.84 metres, achieved in June 2006 in Indianapolis.

She finished third at the 2006 World Athletics Final and sixth at the 2006 World Cup.

References

External links

1981 births
Living people
American female long jumpers
Athletes (track and field) at the 2004 Summer Olympics
Olympic track and field athletes of the United States
Sportspeople from St. Petersburg, Florida
Track and field athletes from Florida
21st-century American women